Parapercis filamentosa, the threadfin sandperch, is a fish species in the sandperch family, Pinguipedidae. It is found in the Western Pacific including Hainan, China and south to Thailand and Indonesia.

References

Randall, J.E., 2001. Pinguipedidae (= Parapercidae, Mugiloididae). Sandperches. p. 3501-3510. In K.E. Carpenter and V. Niem (eds.) FAO species identification guide for fishery purposes. The living marine resources of the Western Central Pacific. Vol. 6. Bony fishes part 4 (Labridae to Latimeriidae), estuarine crocodiles. FAO, Rome.

Pinguipedidae
Taxa named by Franz Steindachner
Fish described in 1878